Samuel Coleridge-Taylor (15 August 18751 September 1912) was a British composer and conductor.

Of mixed-race birth, Coleridge-Taylor achieved such success that he was referred to by white New York musicians as the "African Mahler" when he had three tours of the United States in the early 1900s. He was particularly known for his three cantatas on the epic 1855 poem The Song of Hiawatha by American Henry Wadsworth Longfellow. Coleridge-Taylor premiered the first section in 1898, when he was 22.

He married a British woman, Jessie Walmisley, and both their children had musical careers. Their son Hiawatha adapted his father's music for a variety of performances. Their daughter Avril Coleridge-Taylor became a composer-conductor.

Early life and education

Samuel Coleridge-Taylor was born at 15 Theobalds Road in Holborn, London, to Alice Hare Martin (1856–1953), an Englishwoman, and Daniel Peter Hughes Taylor, a Krio man from Sierra Leone who had studied medicine in London and later became an administrator in West Africa. They were not married, and Daniel had returned to Africa without learning that Alice was pregnant. (Alice's parents had not been married at her birth, either.) Alice named her son Samuel Coleridge Taylor (without a hyphen), after the poet Samuel Taylor Coleridge.

Alice lived with her father, Benjamin Holmans, and his family after Samuel was born. Holmans was a skilled farrier and was married to a woman who was not Alice's mother, with whom he had four daughters and at least one son. Alice and her father called her son Coleridge. In 1887 she married George Evans, a railway worker, and lived in Croydon on a street adjoining the railway line.

There were numerous musicians on Taylor's mother's side, and her father played the violin, teaching it to his grandson from an early age. Taylor's musical ability quickly became apparent, and his grandfather paid for him to have violin lessons. The extended family arranged for Taylor to study at the Royal College of Music from the age of 15. He changed from violin to composition, working under Charles Villiers Stanford. After completing his degree, he became a professional musician; he was  appointed a professor at the Crystal Palace School of Music and began conducting the orchestra at the Croydon Conservatoire.

He later used the name "Samuel Coleridge-Taylor", with a hyphen, said to be following a printer's typographical error. 

In 1894 Taylor's father was appointed a coroner in the colony of Gambia.

Marriage

In 1899 Coleridge-Taylor married Jessie Walmisley, whom he had met as a fellow student at the Royal College of Music. Six years older than him, Jessie had left the college in 1893. Her parents objected to the marriage because Taylor was of mixed-race parentage, but relented and attended the wedding. The couple had a son, named Hiawatha (1900–1980) after a Native American immortalised in poetry, and a daughter Gwendolen Avril (1903–1998). Both had careers in music: Hiawatha adapted his father's works. Gwendolen started composing music early in life, and also became a conductor-composer; she used the professional name of Avril Coleridge-Taylor.

Career
By 1896, Coleridge-Taylor was already earning a reputation as a composer. He was later helped by Edward Elgar, who recommended him to the Three Choirs Festival. His "Ballade in A minor" was premiered there. His early work was also guided by the influential music editor and critic August Jaeger of music publisher Novello; he told Elgar that Taylor was "a genius".

On the strength of Hiawatha's Wedding Feast, which was conducted by Professor Charles Villiers Stanford at its 1898 premiere and proved to be highly popular, Coleridge-Taylor made three tours of the United States in 1904, 1906, and 1910. In the United States, he became increasingly interested in his paternal racial heritage. Coleridge-Taylor participated as the youngest delegate at the 1900 First Pan-African Conference held in London, and met leading Americans through this connection, including poet Paul Laurence Dunbar and scholar and activist W.E.B. Du Bois.

Coleridge-Taylor's father Daniel Taylor was descended from African-American slaves who were freed by the British and evacuated from the colonies at the end of the American War of Independence; some 3,000 of these Black Loyalists were resettled in Nova Scotia. Others were resettled in London and the Caribbean. In 1792 some 1200 blacks from Nova Scotia chose to leave what they considered a hostile climate and society, and moved to Sierra Leone, which the British had established as a colony for free blacks. The Black Loyalists joined free blacks (some of whom were also African Americans) from London, and were joined by maroons from Jamaica, and slaves liberated at sea from illegal slave ships by the British navy. At one stage Coleridge-Taylor seriously considered emigrating to the United States, as he was intrigued by his father's family's past there.

In 1904, on his first tour to the United States, Coleridge-Taylor was received by President Theodore Roosevelt at the White House, a rare event in those days for a man of African descent. His music was widely performed and he had great support among African Americans. Coleridge-Taylor sought to draw from traditional African music and integrate it into the classical tradition, which he considered Johannes Brahms to have done with Hungarian music and Antonín Dvořák with Bohemian music. Having met the African-American poet Paul Laurence Dunbar in London, Taylor set some of his poems to music. A joint recital between Taylor and Dunbar was arranged in London, under the patronage of US Ambassador John Milton Hay. It was organised by Henry Francis Downing, an African-American playwright and London resident. Dunbar and other black people encouraged Coleridge-Taylor to draw from his Sierra Leonean ancestry and the music of the African continent.

Due to his success, Coleridge-Taylor was invited to be one of the judges at music festivals. He was said to be personally shy but was still effective as a conductor.

Composers were not handsomely paid for their music, and they often sold the rights to works outright in order to make immediate income. This caused them to lose the royalties earned by the publishers who had invested in the music distribution through publication. The popular Hiawatha's Wedding Feast sold hundreds of thousands of copies, but Coleridge-Taylor had sold the music outright for the sum of 15 guineas, so did not benefit directly. He learned to retain his rights and earned royalties for other compositions after achieving wide renown but always struggled financially.

Death
Coleridge-Taylor was 37 when he died of pneumonia. His death is often attributed to the stress of his financial situation. He was buried in Bandon Hill Cemetery, Wallington, Surrey (today in the London Borough of Sutton).

Honours
 The inscription on Coleridge-Taylor's carved headstone includes four bars of music from the composer's best-known work, Hiawatha, and a tribute from his close friend, the poet Alfred Noyes, that includes these words:

 King George V granted Jessie Coleridge-Taylor, the young widow, an annual pension of £100, evidence of the high regard in which the composer was held.
 In 1912 a memorial concert was held at the Royal Albert Hall and garnered over £1400 for the composer's family.
 After Coleridge-Taylor's death in 1912, musicians were concerned that he and his family had received no royalties from his Song of Hiawatha, which was one of the most successful and popular works written in the previous 50 years. (He had sold the rights early in order to get income.) His case contributed to their formation of the Performing Right Society, an effort to gain revenues for musicians through performance as well as publication and distribution of music.

Coleridge-Taylor's work continued to be popular. He was later championed by conductor Malcolm Sargent. Between 1928 and 1939, Sargent conducted ten seasons of a large costumed ballet version of The Song of Hiawatha at the Royal Albert Hall, performed by the Royal Choral Society (600 to 800 singers) and 200 dancers.

Legacy

Coleridge-Taylor's greatest success was undoubtedly his cantata Hiawatha's Wedding Feast, which was widely performed by choral groups in England during Coleridge-Taylor's lifetime and in the decades after his death.  Its popularity was rivalled only by the choral standards Handel's Messiah and Mendelssohn's Elijah. The composer soon followed Hiawatha's Wedding Feast with two other cantatas about Hiawatha, The Death of Minnehaha and Hiawatha's Departure. All three were published together, along with an Overture, as The Song of Hiawatha, Op. 30. The tremendously popular Hiawatha seasons at the Royal Albert Hall, which continued until 1939, were conducted by Sargent and involved hundreds of choristers, and scenery covering the organ loft. Hiawatha's Wedding Feast is still occasionally revived.

Coleridge-Taylor also composed chamber music, anthems, and the African Dances for violin, among other works. The Petite Suite de Concert is still regularly played. He set one poem by his namesake Samuel Taylor Coleridge, "The Legend of Kubla Khan".

Coleridge-Taylor was greatly admired by African Americans; in 1901, a 200-voice African-American chorus was founded in Washington, D.C., named the Samuel Coleridge-Taylor Society. He visited the United States three times in the early 1900s, receiving great acclaim, and earned the title "the African Mahler" from the white orchestral musicians in New York in 1910. Public schools were named after him in Louisville, Kentucky, and in Baltimore, Maryland.

Coleridge-Taylor composed a violin concerto for the American violinist Maud Powell. The American performance of the work was subject to rewriting because the parts were lost en route—not, as legend has it, on the RMS Titanic but on another ship. The concerto has been recorded by Philippe Graffin and the Johannesburg Philharmonic Orchestra under Michael Hankinson (nominated "Editor's Choice" in Gramophone magazine), Anthony Marwood and the BBC Scottish Symphony Orchestra under Martyn Brabbins (on Hyperion Records), and Lorraine McAslan and the London Philharmonic Orchestra conducted by Nicholas Braithwaite (on the Lyrita label). It was also performed at Harvard University's Sanders Theatre in the autumn of 1998 by John McLaughlin Williams and William Thomas, as part of the 100th-anniversary celebration of the composition of Hiawatha's Wedding Feast.

Lists of Coleridge-Taylor's compositions and recordings of his work and of the many articles, papers and books about Coleridge-Taylor's life and legacy are available through the Samuel Coleridge-Taylor Foundation and the Samuel Coleridge-Taylor Network.

There are two blue plaques in his memory, one in Dagnall Park, South Norwood, and the other in St Leonards Road, Croydon, at the house where he died.  A metal figure in the likeness of Coleridge-Taylor has been installed in Charles Street, Croydon.

A two-hour documentary, Samuel Coleridge Taylor and His Music in America, 1900–1912 (2013), was made about him and includes a performance of several of his pieces, as well as information about him and his prominent place in music. It was written and directed by Charles Kaufmann, and produced by The Longfellow Chorus.

A feature animation, The Samuel Coleridge-Taylor Story (2013), was made about him, written and directed by Jason Young. It was screened as part of Southwark Black History Month and Croydon Black History Month in 2020.

On 26 August 2021 Coleridge-Taylor's Symphony in A minor received its Proms premier by the Chineke! Orchestra with Kalena Bovell.

Posthumous publishing

In 1999, freelance music editor Patrick Meadows identified three important chamber works by Coleridge-Taylor that had never been printed or made widely available to musicians. A handwritten performing parts edition of the Piano Quintet, from the original in the Royal College of Music (RCM) Library, had been prepared earlier by violinist Martin Anthony Burrage of the Royal Liverpool Philharmonic Orchestra.  The first modern performance of the Piano Quintet was given on 7 November 2001 by Burrage's chamber music group, Ensemble Liverpool / Live-A-Music in Liverpool Philharmonic Hall.  The lunchtime recital included the Fantasiestücke. Live recordings of this performance are lodged with the RCM and the British Library. The artists were Andrew Berridge (violin), Martin Anthony (Tony) Burrage (violin), Joanna Lacey (viola), Michael Parrott (cello) and John Peace (piano).

After receiving copies of the work from the RCM in London, Patrick Meadows made printed playing editions of the Nonet, Piano Quintet and Piano Trio. The works were performed in Meadows's regular chamber music festival on the island of Majorca, and were well received by the public as well as the performers. The first modern performances of some of these works were done in the early 1990s by the Boston, Massachusetts-based Coleridge Ensemble, led by William Thomas of Phillips Academy, Andover. This group subsequently made world premiere recordings of the Nonet, Fantasiestücke for string quartet and Six Negro Folksongs for piano trio, which were released in 1998 by Afka Records. Thomas, a champion of lost works by black composers, also revived Coleridge's Hiawatha's Wedding Feast in a performance commemorating the composition's 100th anniversary with the Cambridge Community Chorus at Harvard's Sanders Theatre in the spring of 1998.

The Nash Ensemble's recording of the Piano Quintet was released in 2007.

In 2006, Meadows finished engraving the first edition of Coleridge-Taylor's Symphony in A minor.  Meadows has also transcribed from the RCM manuscript the Haytian Dances, a work virtually identical to the Noveletten but with a fifth movement inserted by Coleridge-Taylor, based on the Scherzo of the symphony. This work is for string orchestra, tambourine and triangle.

Thelma, the missing opera

Coleridge-Taylor's only large-scale operatic work, Thelma, was long believed to have been lost. As recently as 1995, Geoffrey Self in his biography of Coleridge-Taylor, The Hiawatha Man, stated that the manuscript of Thelma had not been located, and that the piece may have been destroyed by its creator. While researching for a PhD on the life and music of Samuel Coleridge-Taylor, Catherine Carr unearthed the manuscripts of Thelma in the British Library.  She assembled a libretto and catalogued the opera in her thesis, presenting a first critical examination of the work by a thorough investigation of the discovered manuscripts (including copious typeset examples). The work subsequently appeared as such on the catalogue of the British Library.

Thelma is a saga of deceit, magic, retribution and the triumph of love over wickedness.  The composer followed Richard Wagner's manner in eschewing the established "numbers" opera format, preferring to blend recitative, aria and ensemble into a seamless whole.  It is possible that he had read Marie Corelli's 1887 "Nordic" novel Thelma (it appears that the name "Thelma" may have been created by Corelli for her heroine). Coleridge-Taylor composed Thelma between 1907 and 1909; it is alternatively entitled The Amulet.

The full score and vocal score in the British Library are both in the composer's hand – the full score is unbound but complete (save that the vocal parts do not have the words after the first few folios) but the vocal score is bound (in three volumes) and complete with words.  Patrick Meadows and Lionel Harrison prepared a type-set full score, vocal score and libretto (the librettist is uncredited and may be Coleridge-Taylor himself).  As to the heroine of the title, the composer changed her name to "Freda" in both full and vocal scores (although in the full score he occasionally forgets himself and writes "Thelma" instead of "Freda").  Perhaps Coleridge-Taylor changed the name of his heroine (and might have changed the name of the opera, had it been produced) to avoid creating the assumption that his work was a treatment of Corelli's then very popular novel. Since that precaution is scarcely necessary today, Meadows and Harrison decided to revert to the original Thelma.

There are minor discrepancies between the full score and the vocal score (the occasional passage occurring in different keys in the two, for example), but nothing that would inhibit the production of a complete, staged performance.

Thelma received its world première in Croydon's Ashcroft Theatre in February 2012, the centenary year of the composer's death, performed by Surrey Opera, using an edition prepared by Stephen Anthony Brown. It was conducted by Jonathan Butcher, directed by Christopher Cowell and designed by Bridget Kimak. Joanna Weeks sang the title role, with Alberto Sousa as Eric and Håkan Vramsmo as Carl.

List of compositions

With opus number

 Piano Quintet in G minor, Op. 1 – 1893
 Nonet in F minor for oboe, clarinet, bassoon, horn, violin, viola, cello, contrabass and piano, Op. 2 – 1894
 Suite for Violin and Organ (or piano), Op. 3 (Suite de Piêces)- 1893
 Ballade in D minor, Op. 4 – 1895
 Five Fantasiestücke, Op. 5 – 1896
 Little Songs for Little Folks, Op. 6 – 1898
 Zara's Earrings, Op. 7 – 1895
 Symphony in A minor, Op. 8 – 1896
 Two Romantic Pieces, Op. 9 – 1896
 Quintet in F sharp minor for clarinet and strings, Op. 10 – 1895
 Southern Love Songs, Op. 12 – 1896
 String Quartet in D minor, Op. 13 – 1896 (lost)
 Legend (Concertstück), Op. 14
 Land of the Sun, Op. 15 – 1897
 Three Hiawatha Sketches for violin and piano, Op. 16 – 1897
 African Romances (P. L. Dunbar) Op. 17 – 1897
 Morning and Evening Service in F, Op. 18 – 1899
 Two Moorish Tone-Pictures, Op. 19 – 1897
 Gypsy Suite, Op. 20 – 1898
 Part Songs, Op. 21 – 1898
 Four Characteristic Waltzes, Op. 22 – 1899
 Valse-Caprice, Op. 23 – 1898
 In Memoriam, three rhapsodies for low voice and piano, Op. 24 – 1898
 Dream Lovers, Operatic Romance, Op. 25 – 1898
 The Gitanos, cantata-operetta, Op. 26 – 1898
 Violin Sonata in D minor, Op. 28 – ?1898 (pub. 1917)
 Three Songs, Op. 29 – 1898
 The Song of Hiawatha, Op. 30 ("Overture to The Song of Hiawatha", 1899; "Hiawatha's Wedding Feast", 1898; "The Death of Minnehaha", 1899; "Hiawatha's Departure", 1900)
 Three Humoresques, Op. 31 – 1898
 Ballade in A minor, Op. 33 – 1898
 African Suite, Op. 35 – 1899
 Six Songs, Op. 37
 Three Silhouettes, Op. 38 – 1904
 Romance in G, Op. 39 – 1900
 Solemn Prelude, Op. 40 – 1899
 Scenes From An Everyday Romance, Op. 41 – 1900
 The Soul's Expression, four sonnets, Op. 42 – 1900
 The Blind Girl of Castél-Cuillé, Op. 43
 Idyll, Op. 44 – 1901
 Six American Lyrics, Op. 45 – 1903
 Concert Overture, Toussaint L'Ouverture, Op. 46 – 1901
 Hemo Dance, scherzo, Op. 47(1) – 1902
 Herod, incidental music, Op. 47(2) – 1901
 Meg Blane, Rhapsody of the Sea, Op. 48 – 1902
 Ullyses, incidental music, Op. 49 – 1902
 Three Song Poems, Op. 50 – 1904
 Four Novelletten, Op. 51(1?) – 1903
 Ethiopia Saluting the Colours, march, Op. 51(2?) – 1902
 The Atonement, sacred cantata, Op. 53 – 1903
 Five Choral Ballads, Op. 54 – 1904
 Moorish Dance, Op. 55 – 1904
 Three Cameos for Piano, Op. 56 – 1904
 Six Sorrow Songs, Op. 57 – 1904
 Four African Dances, Op. 58 – 1904
 Twenty-Four Negro Melodies, Op. 59(1) – 1905
 Romance, Op. 59(2) – 1904
 Kubla Khan, rhapsody, Op. 61 – 1905
 Nero, incidental music, Op. 62 – 1906
 Symphonic Variations on an African Air, Op. 63 – 1906
 Scenes de Ballet, Op. 64 – 1906
 Endymion's Dream, one-act opera, Op. 65 – 1910
 Forest Scenes, Op. 66 – 1907
 Part Songs, Op. 67 – 1905
 Bon-Bon Suite, Op. 68 – 1908
 Sea Drift, Op. 69 – 1908
 Faust, incidental music, Op. 70 – 1908
 Valse Suite: "Three fours", Op. 71- 1909
 Thelma, opera in three acts, Op. 72 – 1907-09
 Ballade in C minor, Op. 73 – 1909
 Forest of Wild Thyme, incidental music, Op. 74 (five numbers) – 1911–25
 Rhapsodic Dance, The Bamboula, Op. 75 – 1911
 A Tale of Old Japan, Op. 76 – 1911
 Petite Suite de Concert, Op. 77 – 1911
 Three Impromptus, Op. 78 – 1911
 Othello, incidental music, Op. 79 – 1911
 Violin Concerto in G minor, Op. 80 – 1912
 Two Songs for Baritone Voice, Op. 81 – 1913
 Hiawatha Ballet in five scenes, Op. 82 – 1920

Without opus number
 Trio in E minor (1893)
 The Lee Shore
 Eulalie
 Variations for Cello and Piano

Recordings
 Samuel Coleridge-Taylor: Special Limited First Recording, November 2001, Liverpool Philharmonic Hall: inc. first performance in more than a century of the Quintet for Piano & Strings in G min. Op. 1 [realised for performance from the original score by Martin Anthony Burrage, and performed by him and RLPO colleagues], plus Fantasiestucke for String Quartet Op.5
 Ballade in A minor, op. 33, Symphonic Variations on an African Air, op. 63 - Royal Liverpool Philharmonic Orchestra, Grant Llewellyn, Argo Records 436 401-2
 Samuel Coleridge-Taylor: Chamber Music – Hawthorne String Quartet. Label: Koch International 3-7056-2
 Heart & Hereafter - Collected Songs, Elizabeth Llewellyn (soprano), Simon Lepper (piano). Label: Orchid Classics ORC100164 (2021)
 Hiawatha – Welsh National Opera, – conductor Kenneth Alwyn, soloist Bryn Terfel. Label: Decca 458 591–2
 Piano & Clarinet Quintets – Nash Ensemble. Label: Hyperion CDA67590
 Violin Sonata; African Dances; Hiawathan Sketches; Petite Suite de Concert – David Juritz (violin), Michael Dussek (piano). Label: Epoch CDLX 7127
 Sir Malcolm Sargent conducts British Music includes "Othello Suite" – New Symphony Orchestra. Label: Beulah 1PD13
 The Romantic Violin Concerto Volume 5 includes "Violin Concerto in G minor, Op. 80" – Anthony Marwood (violin), BBC Scottish Symphony Orchestra, Martyn Brabbins (conductor). Label: Hyperion CDA67420
 Symphony, Op. 8, Aarhus Symphony Orchestra, Douglas Bostock (conductor), in The British Symphonic Collection, Vol. 15. Classico label by Olufsen Records
 2nd of the Three Impromptus, Op. 78 for organ, on Now Let Us Sing!, 2013 recording by the Choir of Worcester Cathedral, played by Christopher Allsop.

References

Sources and further reading
 
  Bobby & Co., London (n.d)
 , personal printing

External links

 Samuel Coleridge-Taylor Foundation
 Songs by Samuel Coleridge-Taylor at The Art Song Project
 "Samuel Coleridge-Taylor  (1875–1912)", AfriClassical.com
 "Samuel Coleridge-Taylor (1875–1912)", Composer of the Week, BBC Radio 3
 "Samuel Coleridge-Taylor (1875–1912)" at BBC Music
 "Who Was Samuel Coleridge-Taylor? (He's Not to Be Confused with Samuel Taylor Coleridge)", Londonist, 19 May 2017.
 Samuel Coleridge-Taylor and His Music in America, 1900–1912 The full Longfellow Chorus documentary on YouTube
 Samuel Coleridge Taylor. Melody (1898). Andrew Pink (2021) Exordia ad missam.

Scores
 The Samuel Coleridge-Taylor Collection at the Irving S. Gilmore Music Library, Yale University
 Four characteristic waltzes. Op. 22 at the Sibley Music Library Digital Scores Collection
 "Five and twenty sailormen" at the Sibley Music Library Digital Scores Collection
 Concerto in G minor for violin & orchestra, op. 80 at the Sibley Music Library Digital Scores Collection
 Organ music, Selections at the Sibley Music Library Digital Scores Collection
 Sonata in D minor for violin and piano, op. 28 at the Sibley Music Library Digital Scores Collection
 Variations in B minor for violoncello & piano at the Sibley Music Library Digital Scores Collection
 Liner Notes for the Hyperion recording of the Violin Concerto Op. 80
 
 

1875 births
1912 deaths
19th-century British composers
19th-century British male musicians
19th-century classical composers
19th-century English musicians
20th-century British male musicians
20th-century classical composers
20th-century English composers
Alumni of the Royal College of Music
Black British classical musicians
Black classical composers
Deaths from pneumonia in England
English classical composers
English male classical composers
English opera composers
English people of African-American descent
English people of Sierra Leonean descent
English Romantic composers
Light music composers
Male opera composers
Musicians from London
Oratorio composers
People from Croydon
People from Holborn
Pupils of Charles Villiers Stanford
Sierra Leone Creole people